Bad Bayersoien is a German municipality in the district of Garmisch-Partenkirchen, in Bavaria.

Gallery

References

Garmisch-Partenkirchen (district)
Spa towns in Germany